Tristramella simonis, the short jaw tristramella, is a vulnerable species of cichlid fish from the Jordan River system, including Lake Tiberias (Kinneret), in Israel and Syria, with introduced populations in the Nahr al-Kabir and Orontes basins in Syria. It prefers waters with little or no movement. Along with other tilapias, T. simonis is commonly caught as a food fish in parts of its range and it is commercially important in Lake Tiberias.

Conservation status and taxonomy
It is the only member of the genus Tristramella that remains extant, but it is vulnerable according to the IUCN. Primary threats are water extraction and climate change reducing the rain in its range. Other potential threats are uncontrolled fishing, and outbreaks of a viral disease that causes blindness in tilapia, including T. simonis. The species survives in less than ten locations. The primary location is Lake Tiberias where it remained common, the population was not threatened and fisheries are well-controlled (unlike other parts of its range). However, in a review of catches in Lake Tiberias, a strong and serious decline was observed in 2006–2016 compared to 1996–2005, which was even more extreme if compared to 1986–1995. If looking at each year in 2000–2015, there was a sudden strong decline to very low levels in 2005–2006, with a slight rebound in 2010, then followed by very low levels again. It likely has the potential to rebound, as small juveniles are still common. Two northern populations, intermidia from Lake Hula and magdelainea from the vicinity of Damascus, are extinct, but their taxonomic status is uncertain. In the past, they were recognized as subspecies of T. simonis by FishBase and they are still recognized as valid, separate species by the IUCN, which however has not reviewed their status since 2006. Today FishBase and Catalog of Fishes consider both intermidia and magdelainea as synonyms of T. simonis.

In contrast to the conservation status in much of its native range, a survey in Syria in 2008 found that T. simonis had been introduced to the Nahr al-Kabir and Orontes basins. It was abundant at some of these locations, even thriving in man-made habitats like reservoirs.

Appearance and behavior

It resembles a typical tilapia, usually being overall olive–brownish to golden–brownish, sometimes with a banded pattern. Compared to the extinct T. sacra, T. simonis has a proportionally shorter head and its lower jaw at most protrudes slightly past the upper jaw. They also differ in their teeth (number and shape) and certain meristics. If recognized as valid, the extinct intermidia and magdelainea only differ slightly in proportions and other details compared to T. simonis.

T. simonis mostly feeds on phytoplankton and macrophytes, but also takes zooplankton and small benthic invertebrates. In Lake Tiberias, adults are found in open-water schools for much of the year, while the young live in sheltered habitats near the coast. It is a mouthbrooder, but some sources indicate this only is done by the female, while others indicate it is done by both parents. Shortly after they are picked up in the parent's mouth.

Although hybrids are well-known among tilapias, hybrids between Tristramella and other tilapias are unknown. Despite both living in Lake Tiberias and them being close relatives, hybridization between T. simonis and the now-extinct T. sacra also is not known to have occurred. A species of fish louse, Argulus tristramellae, apparently is host specific, only parasitizing T. simonis (even when still common, T. sacra was not attacked by this fish louse).

References

simonis
Taxonomy articles created by Polbot
Taxa named by Albert Günther
Fish described in 1864
Sea of Galilee
Cichlid fish of Asia
Freshwater fish of Western Asia
Fish of Israel
Fish of Syria